The Church of God for All Nations is a theocratic Pentecostal holiness body of Christians.

Samuel Doffee (February 2, 1931 – April 23, 2010), formed The Church of God for All Nations in 1981. Doffee had been previously associated with the Church of God of Prophecy and The Church of God (Jerusalem Acres), and served in various ministerial capacities in the latter body. Bishop Grady R. Kent founded The Church of God of All Nations (now "Jerusalem Acres") in 1957. After settling on the name "The Church of God of All Nations", Bishop Kent was persuaded by other in the Church Pattern to change the name to The Church of God at Jerusalem Acres.

After the death of Kent in 1964, the church governance gradually moved away from "theocratic" rule through the "Chief Bishop", toward a more democratic rule through the General Assembly. Bishop Doffee continued to preach what he believed was the prophetic message of Bishop Kent, as well as "theocratic" church government, and was disfellowshipped by the Church of God (Jerusalem Acres). In 1980, Doffee believed he was instructed by prophecy to reorganize the Church of God, and chartered the new church in 1981. 

The doctrines of The Church of God for All Nations are similar to its parent body, with greater emphasis on theocracy and prophecy. Individuals must experience salvation, justification, sanctification, and the baptism of the Holy Ghost, which is marked by the evidence of speaking in tongues. Divine healing, miracles, and deliverance from evil spirits are considered present-day ministries. Officers in the church are apostle, prophet, evangelist, pastor, and teacher.  This group believes very explicitly that the "Great Apostasy" began in AD 325 with the Council of Nicaea and continued until June 13, 1903, when Bishop Ambrose Jessup Tomlinson restored the Church, and that in the interim there was no actual theocratic governmental formed (as Jesus formed it) Church of God upon the earth, but that born-again people were abundant and continued to be "saved" or "born again" according to the Bible.

The Midnight Cry Messenger is the official church publication. Headquarters of the church are in Cleveland, Tennessee. Samuel Doffee served as Chief Bishop until his death on April 23, 2010. This body has one church in the United States and about five churches in Kenya, Africa. The Bishop of Africa is Justus Masika Khisa, and the African offices are being built in Bungoma, Kenya.

External links
Official web site
Samuel Doffee Obituary

Pentecostalism in Tennessee
Pentecostal denominations
Christian organizations established in 1981
Holiness denominations
1981 establishments in Tennessee